Hypocladia calita is a moth of the subfamily Arctiinae. It was described by Paul Dognin in 1911. It is found in Colombia.

References

 Natural History Museum Lepidoptera generic names catalog

Arctiinae
Moths described in 1911